Ruben Trumpelmann (born 1 February 1998) is a South African born-Namibian cricketer, who now plays for the Namibia cricket team.

Early life and education
Trumpelmann was born in Durban, South Africa to a Namibian-born father and spent his early life in Pretoria. He was educated at Afrikaans Hoer Skool, South Africa.

Career
He made his List A debut for Northerns in the 2017–18 CSA Provincial One-Day Challenge on 12 November 2017. He made his first-class debut for Northerns in the 2017–18 Sunfoil 3-Day Cup on 23 November 2017.

In September 2018, he was named in Northerns' squad for the 2018 Africa T20 Cup. He made his Twenty20 debut for Northerns in the 2018 Africa T20 Cup on 14 September 2018. He was the leading wicket-taker for Northerns in the 2018–19 CSA 3-Day Provincial Cup, with 23 dismissals in eight matches.

Trumpelmann became eligible to play international cricket for Namibia due to his father having been born in Windhoek. In March 2021, he was named in Namibia's Twenty20 International (T20I) squad for their series against Uganda. In September 2021, Trumpelmann was named in Namibia's Twenty20 International (T20I) squad for the 2021 ICC Men's T20 World Cup. He was also named in Namibia's T20I squad for the 2021 Summer T20 Bash, played just before the World Cup. He made his T20I debut on 5 October 2021, for Namibia against the United Arab Emirates.

In November 2021, he was named in Namibia's One Day International (ODI) squad for the 2021 Namibia Tri-Nation Series. He made his ODI debut on 26 November 2021, for Namibia against Oman.

References

External links
 

1998 births
Living people
South African cricketers
South African people of Namibian descent
South African emigrants to Namibia
Namibian cricketers
Namibia One Day International cricketers
Namibia Twenty20 International cricketers
Northerns cricketers
People from Durban